The  Parthenon League was a football league covering Greater London and the surrounding area.

History
The league was formed in 1951 with 11 clubs, nine of which had come from the  Middlesex Senior League. By 1954 the league had grown to 16 clubs, but then slowly lost members until 1960 when a second division was added, although largely filled with reserve teams. However, the league was dissolved in 1966 and was replaced by the Middlesex League.

List of champions

Member clubs
During its history, member clubs included:

Addlestone
Arlesey Town
Atlas Sports
Baldock Town
Barnes
Basildon Town
Battersea United
Bees Club
Boreham Wood
British European Airways
Byron Wanderers
Camberley Wanderers
Canvey Island
Chalfont National

Chalfont St Peter
Chingford
Collier Row
Crown & Manor
Ditton Old Boys
Edmonton BOC
Egham Town
Epping Town
Finsbury
Fisher Athletic
Harefield United
Harold Hill
Hatfield Town
Kings Langley

Kingsbury Town
Kodak
London Transport Buses
Northolt Saints
Orpington Athletic
Paddington Town
Post Office Engineers
Rainham Town Reserves
Rayners Lane
Rickmansworth Town
Rootes Athletic
Ruislip Town
Saffron Walden Town
Shefford Town

South Vale Glacier
Southall Athletic
Southall Corinthians
Spelthorne
Staines Town
Surbiton Byron
Surbiton Town
Tudor Park
Twickenham
Wandsworth
Wapping Sports
Westfield
Willesden
Wingate

References

 
Defunct football leagues in England
Football competitions in London
1951 establishments in England
1966 disestablishments in England